Mill Creek Township is the name of some places in the U.S. state of Pennsylvania:

Mill Creek Township, Lycoming County, Pennsylvania
Mill Creek Township, Mercer County, Pennsylvania

See also
Millcreek Township, Pennsylvania (disambiguation)

Pennsylvania township disambiguation pages